Médina Pikine or Médina Pikine City is a neighborhood north of the town center of Pikine, Senegal, where Alassane Djigo Stadium is located.

It has a population of 5,480. Schools in the neighborhood include Pikine 7/A, Elimane Ndiaye B, Centre Rayonnement, and Baba Gangué. It also has a 
lycée, Lycée Mame Yélli Badiane, and a college, CEM Mame Yélli Badiane.

Populated places in Dakar Region